The A13 highway is a highway in Lithuania (Magistralinis kelias). It connects Klaipėda with the Latvian border near Būtingė. From there, the road continues to Liepaja as A11. The length of the road is 45.15 km.

The section between Jakai (A1) junction and Palanga (A11) junction is dual-carriageway. The section between the junction with 168 and Palanga is planned to be refurbished to limited-access expressway with a default speed limit of 120 km/h. From A11 junction to the Latvian border, the road continues as regular 1+1.

This route is a part of the International E-road network (part of European route E272).

References 

Roads in Lithuania